The 1937 New York Yankees season was their 35th season. The team finished with a record of 102–52, winning their 9th pennant, finishing 13 games ahead of the Detroit Tigers. New York was managed by Joe McCarthy. The Yankees played at Yankee Stadium. In the World Series, they beat the New York Giants in 5 games. This gave the Yankees a 3-to-2 edge in overall series play against the Giants.

1937 saw significant changes in the layout of Yankee Stadium, as concrete bleachers were built to replace the aging wooden structure, reducing the cavernous "death valley" of left center and center considerably, although the area remained a daunting target for right-handed power hitters such as Joe DiMaggio.

Regular season

Season standings

Record vs. opponents

Roster

Player stats

Batting

Starters by position
Note: Pos = Position; G = Games played; AB = At bats; H = Hits; Avg. = Batting average; HR = Home runs; RBI = Runs batted in

Other batters
Note: G = Games played; AB = At bats; H = Hits; Avg. = Batting average; HR = Home runs; RBI = Runs batted in

Pitching

Starting pitchers
Note: G = Games pitched; IP = Innings pitched; W = Wins; L = Losses; ERA = Earned run average; SO = Strikeouts

Other pitchers
Note: G = Games pitched; IP = Innings pitched; W = Wins; L = Losses; ERA = Earned run average; SO = Strikeouts

Relief pitchers
Note: G = Games pitched; W = Wins; L = Losses; SV = Saves; ERA = Earned run average; SO = Strikeouts

1937 World Series 

AL New York Yankees (4) vs. NL New York Giants (1)

Farm system

LEAGUE CHAMPIONS: Newark, Norfolk (Piedmont), Rogers, Bassett, Snow Hill, Butler

Notes

References
1937 New York Yankees at Baseball Reference
1937 World Series
1937 New York Yankees team page at www.baseball-almanac.com

New York Yankees seasons
New York Yankees
New York Yankees
1930s in the Bronx
American League champion seasons
World Series champion seasons